Adèle Ferrand (20 October 1817 – 1 April 1848) was a 19th-century French painter and draughtswoman on the island of La Réunion in the southwestern Indian Ocean.

Born in Nancy, Ferrand became very early a master of the Romantic school before settling in the colony then called Bourbon to follow her husband, half-brother of the extremely rich .

She died at the age of 30 from typhoid fever in the island of La Réunion.

External links 
 Le mystère Adèle Ferrand, identification d’une artiste réunionnaise
 Exposition Adèle FERRAND in Musée Léon Dierx
 Self portrait

French romantic painters
French women painters
Artists from Nancy, France
1817 births
1848 deaths
Deaths from typhoid fever
19th-century French women artists